Alpine penstemon is a common name for several plants and may refer to:

Penstemon davidsonii, native to North America
Penstemon venustus, native to the northwestern United States
Penstemon glaber, var. alpinus